Guyana competed at the 1984 Summer Olympics in Los Angeles, United States. Ten competitors, eight men and two women, took part in twelve events in three sports.

Athletics

Women's Long Jump
Jennifer Inniss
 Qualification — 6.17 m (→ did not advance, 13th place)

Boxing

Cycling

Three cyclists represented Guyana in 1984.

Individual road race
 Randolph Toussaint — did not finish (→ no ranking)

Sprint
 James Joseph

Points race
 Aubrey Richmond

References

External links
Official Olympic Reports

Nations at the 1984 Summer Olympics
1984
1984 in Guyanese sport